Otis Dalino Wright II (born July 31, 1944) is a United States district judge of the United States District Court for the Central District of California.

Early life and education
Born in Tuskegee, Alabama, Wright received a Bachelor of Arts degree from California State University at Los Angeles in 1976 and a Juris Doctor from Southwestern Law School in 1980. He was in the United States Marine Corps from 1963 to 1966, remaining in the United States Marine Corps Reserve until 1969. He was a deputy sheriff in the Los Angeles County Sheriff's Department from 1969 to 1980. He was a deputy attorney general in the Office of the Attorney General, California Department of Justice from 1980 to 1983. He was in private practice in Los Angeles, California from 1983 to 2005.

Judicial service
On October 28, 2005, California Governor Arnold Schwarzenegger announced that he would be appointing Wright to serve as a judge on the Los Angeles County Superior Court.  Wright replaced Judge Lorna Parnell.

Wright was nominated to the United States District Court for the Central District of California by President George W. Bush on September 5, 2006, to a seat vacated by Gary L. Taylor. He was confirmed by the United States Senate on March 15, 2007, and received his commission on April 16, 2007.

Notable cases

{| class=wikitable
|-
! Case !! Year || Reason for becoming widely discussed or noted
|-
|Spokeo, Inc. v. Robins||2011||Ruled against plaintiff's standing to sue because he had not alleged a sufficiently individualized injury. Wright was reversed by the unanimous United States Court of Appeals for the Ninth Circuit, which was itself then found to be in error by the U.S. Supreme Court.  On remand, the Ninth Circuit again found the plaintiff had standing to sue.
|-
| Prenda Law || 2013 || Ruling against a "notorious" U.S. law firm and principals, which was viewed by onlookers and the court as engaging in copyright trolling and alleged legal extortion practices, often via shell companies. The case resulted in sanctions and law firm dissolution. Wright's opinion included a number of Star Trek catchphrases.
|-
| U.S.A. v. Hudson, Whitfield & Dunlap || 2014 || Ruling against legitimacy of a Bureau of Alcohol, Tobacco, Firearms and Explosives ("ATF") fictional stash-house robbery sting operation; such operations had drawn significant media and judicial concerns previously for a perceived inherent lack of fairness.
|-
|Alan Baker v. Allstate Insurance Company || 2019 || Imposed sanctions in the amount of  after plaintiff's attorney Christopher Hook sent widely publicized emails containing profanities and threats to counsel for Allstate.
|-
|SpaceX v. U.S. Air Force
|2020
|SpaceX was not entitled to relief after the Air Force awarded contracts to United Launch Alliance (ULA), Blue Origin, and Northrop Grumman to help those companies with costs of developing new rockets and infrastructure. 
|-
|TikTok Inc. v. Donald J. Trump and U.S. Department of Commerce
|2020
|Case pending litigation. The case impacts the nearly 80 million TikTok users in the United States and has drawn significant attention from the press.
|}

See also 
 List of African-American federal judges
 List of African-American jurists

References

External links

1944 births
Living people
African-American judges
California state court judges
California State University, Los Angeles alumni
Judges of the United States District Court for the Central District of California
Military personnel from Tuskegee, Alabama
Southwestern Law School alumni
Superior court judges in the United States
United States district court judges appointed by George W. Bush
21st-century American judges
United States Marines
United States Marine Corps reservists